Malik Reed (born August 5, 1996) is an American football linebacker for the Miami Dolphins of the National Football League (NFL). He played college football at Nevada and signed with the Denver Broncos as an undrafted free agent in 2019.

College career
Reed played at the University of Nevada, Reno from 2015 to 2018. During his career he had 203 tackles and 22 sacks.

Professional career

Denver Broncos
Reed signed with the Denver Broncos as an undrafted free agent in 2019.

In Week 6 of the 2020 season against the New England Patriots, Reed recorded his first two sacks of the season on Cam Newton during the 18–12 win.
In Week 7 against the Kansas City Chiefs, Reed recorded another two sacks, this time on Patrick Mahomes, during the 43–16 loss.

Pittsburgh Steelers
On August 30, 2022, the Broncos traded Reed to the Pittsburgh Steelers.

Miami Dolphins
On March 20, 2023, Reed signed a one-year contract with the Miami Dolphins.

Personal life
Reed is a Christian. Reed is married to Cidavia Reed.

References

External links
Pittsburgh Steelers bio
Nevada Wolfpack bio

1996 births
Living people
American football defensive ends
American football linebackers
Denver Broncos players
Nevada Wolf Pack football players
Players of American football from Alabama
Sportspeople from Dothan, Alabama
Pittsburgh Steelers players